Rope of Sand is a 1949 adventure-suspense film noir directed by William Dieterle, produced by Hal Wallis, and starring Burt Lancaster and three stars from Wallis's Casablanca - Paul Henreid, Claude Rains and Peter Lorre. The film introduces Corinne Calvet and features Sam Jaffe, John Bromfield, and Kenny Washington in supporting roles. The picture is set in South West Africa. Desert portions of the film were shot in Yuma, Arizona.

Plot
Hunting guide Mike Davis (Burt Lancaster) came across a cache of diamonds in a mining area, located in a remote region of South West Africa. He was caught by the mine's police, but refused to reveal the diamonds' location, even under torture at the hand of the diamond company's security chief, Vogel (Paul Henreid). He left South Africa for some time.

Davis returns to get the diamonds, which he still expects will be at the spot where he found them. The mining company's owner, Martingale (Claude Rains), tries to find out where the diamonds can be found by guile rather than force. He hires a beautiful prostitute, Suzanne Renaud (Corinne Calvet), to seduce Davis, and get him to reveal the secret location. Davis plans an illegal entry into the diamond mining area, to retrieve the diamonds, and plans to escape to Portuguese Angola. 
Meanwhile, Vogel is attracted to Suzanne, and offers to marry her; but Suzanne is attracted to Davis, who is more interested in his diamonds than Suzanne.
Davis finds the diamonds; but Martingale threatens to kill Suzanne, unless Davis gives him the diamonds. Davis gives up the diamonds, and ends up leaving the country with Suzanne, discovering that he loves her more than the diamonds.

Cast
 Burt Lancaster as Mike Davis
 Paul Henreid as Vogel
 Claude Rains as Martingale
 Corinne Calvet as Suzanne
 Peter Lorre as Toady
 Sam Jaffe as Dr. Hunter
 John Bromfield as Thompson, a guard
 Mike Mazurki as Pierson, a guard
 Kenny Washington as John
 Edmund Breon as Chairman
 Hayden Rorke as Ingram
 David Thursby as Henry, the bartender
 Josef Marais as Specialty Singer
 Miranda Marais as Specialty Singer

Background
According to the Paramount Collection at the Academy of Motion Picture Arts and Sciences (AMPAS) library, the desert sequences were shot in Yuma, Arizona.

Paul Henreid was blacklisted from major studios at the time, but says he was cast because Dieterle was an old friend of his, and Hal Wallis was supportive of the actor being cast. Henreid said the role was a departure for him, but "it had the greatest lines in the script, and I had a lot of fun doing it."

Reception

Critical response
Film critic Glenn Erickson reflected on the background of the film, and how it was received when first released: "A polished production on all technical levels, the gritty Rope of Sand was filmed from a screenplay purchased by producer Wallis specifically for Burt Lancaster in 1947. Although William Dieterle's direction is capable, the script works too hard to introduce an overly familiar collection of stock thriller types ... Critics generally liked Lancaster's performance, even if they slighted the work of Claude Rains and Peter Lorre, and saved the bulk of their praise for Paul Henried's nasty villain. Lancaster's own assessment of the film was unprintable, but he was quoted at a time when he was itching to move on to more interesting roles.

Accolades
Nominated
 Golden Globes: Best Screenplay, Walter Doniger, 1950.

References

External links
 
 
 
 Rope of Sand information site and DVD review at DVD Beaver (includes images)

Streaming audio
 Rope of Sand on Screen Directors Playhouse: April 28, 1950

1948 films
1940s adventure films
American adventure films
American black-and-white films
1940s English-language films
Film noir
Films scored by Franz Waxman
Films directed by William Dieterle
Films produced by Hal B. Wallis
Films set in South Africa
Paramount Pictures films
1940s American films